Brigalowia setifera is a species of beetle in the family Carabidae, the only species in the genus Brigalowia.

References

Lebiinae